The Yuanlin Performance Hall is a performance center in Yuanlin City, Changhua County, Taiwan. It is the largest cultural building in the county.

History
The construction of the hall started on 15 December 1997 and was opened on 12 August 2001.

Architecture
The hall consists of performance hall, small theater, exhibition room, library etc. It was designed by Shao Dong Gang Architect and Associates. In 2012, the hall was equipped with QSC Audio Products.

Transportation
The center is accessible within walking distance southeast of Yuanlin Station of Taiwan Railways.

See also
 List of tourist attractions in Taiwan

References

External links

  

2001 establishments in Taiwan
Buildings and structures in Changhua County
Concert halls in Taiwan